Haras de Saint Pair du Mont  is a Thoroughbred horse breeding farm at Le Cadran near Cambremer in Calvados, Normandy. The business was founded circa the 1880s by renowned horseman, Leonce Delatre whose estate sold the property to Evremond de Saint-Alary in the early 1890s. On his death in 1941, Saint-Alary left the property to a lady friend, Mademoiselle Frémont-Tousch. Following her death, the farm was acquired by Jean Stern. In 1971, Stern's daughter, Madame Sanjust di Teulada, took over management of the property and the following March at Auteuil Racecourse disposed of a large portion of the bloodstock. In 1998 a Swedish gentleman named Goranson purchased the farm which still operates to this day under the management of Thierry de Chambord.

Over the years, Haras de Saint Pair du Mont became famous for both racing and breeding such horses as Ksar, Omnium II,  Bruleur, Leading sire in France in 1921, 1924, and 1929, Rialto, and Sicambre. Under Jean Stern, the stable was involved in both flat and steeplechase racing. His jump horses won the Paris Grand Steeplechase on four occasions and the 1950 Gran Premio Merano in Italy.

References
 Haras de Saint Pair du Mont official website

French racehorse owners and breeders
Horse farms in France
Buildings and structures in Calvados (department)